The Kentucky Drillers were a professional indoor football team based in Pikeville, Kentucky. The franchise started as the Eastern Kentucky Drillers and joined the Continental Indoor Football League (CIFL) in 2013 after playing their first two seasons as a charter member of the Ultimate Indoor Football League (UIFL) for its inaugural 2011 season. The owner of the Drillers was Rick Kranz. The Drillers played their home games at the Eastern Kentucky Expo Center in Pikeville, Kentucky.

Franchise history

2011

On November 26, 2010, the UIFL announced that the team in Pikeville, Kentucky, would be named the Eastern Kentucky Drillers. The Owner of the team Rick Kranz and the Head Coach  and Kirk Ramsey on the defensive side, Drillers lost their first game in franchise history, a 44-49 defeat to the hands of the Saginaw Sting. Even in the defeat, two Drillers (Aric Evans and David Jones), won the first ever Offensive Player of the Week and Special Teams Player of the Week Awards in the history of the Ultimate Indoor Football League. The following week, the Drillers played their first ever home game at Eastern Kentucky Expo Center, and in front of 3,500 fans, the Drillers won 37-26 over the Huntington Hammer.

2012

The Drillers made few changes to their team going into 2012, but the hiring of defensive coordinator, Jimmy Brookins is going to be vital to another Ultimate Bowl run, as he looked to keep the Drillers atop the UIFL rankings for defense.

2013

On July 19, 2012, it was announced that the Drillers would leave the UIFL and join the Continental Indoor Football League, and change their name to the Kentucky Drillers. During this season, Prestonsburg, Kentucky, mayor and Drillers' investor, Jerry Fannin, used city money to help fund the team. It was estimated he spent approximately $7,800 on the team and he was charged in February 2017.

Awards and honors
The following is a list of all (Eastern) Kentucky Drillers players who won individual awards and honors.

Notable coaches

Head coaches

Coaching staff

Season-by-season results

References

 
2010 establishments in Kentucky
2013 disestablishments in Kentucky
Pikeville, Kentucky